Christian Mansell (born 9 February 2005) is an Australian racing driver who is currently competing in the 2023 FIA Formula 3 Championship with Campos Racing. He previously competed in the 2022 Euroformula Open Championship for CryptoTower Racing, finishing in third overall in the standings.

Career

Karting 
Mansell did not achieve much karting success, his highest finish in the CIK-FIA Karting European Championship came in 2019, where he achieved 69th in the OKJ category.

Lower formulae

2019 
In 2019, Mansell made his single-seater debut in the New South Wales Formula Race Car Championship. The Bolwarra resident also raced in two rounds of the Australian Formula 4 Championship with AGI Sport and finished all but one race in the top seven. However, due to Mansell being a guest driver he was not classified in the standings.

2020 
For 2020 Mansell moved over to the United Kingdom to race full-time in the F4 British Championship, partnering Zak O'Sullivan and Matías Zagazeta at Carlin. Whilst the Australian only managed to score one win at the Brands Hatch Circuit, in contrast to O'Sullivan's nine over the course of the season, he did score four more podiums, which included two third places and a second place at the final round. This led to Mansell finishing seventh in the championship at the end of the year. Furthermore, Mansell would come out victorious in that season's Rookie Cup, winning that title with a 61.5 point gap to Frederick Lubin.

GB3 Championship 
Mansell stayed on with Carlin in 2021, progressing to the renamed GB3 Championship. The Aussie took his first win of the season in the reversed grid race at the opening round in Brands Hatch, after overtaking six cars over the course of the race. His next win came at the Circuit de Spa-Francorchamps, claiming it in the first race. Mansell scored a further three podiums to rank third in the standings.

Euroformula Open

2021 
In 2021, Mansell made his Euroformula Open Championship debut at the Circuit de Spa-Francorchamps, with Carlin finishing all his races in the top six. Mansell returned to Euroformula but with Team Motopark during the penultimate round at Monza, and achieved a third place during the first race. He was retained for the Barcelona, where he scored more points to rank 11th overall.

2022 

Mansell remained in the series for the 2022 season, partnering Vladislav Lomko and Josh Mason at CryptoTower Racing. The Australian started his season out in strong fashion, taking the opening victory of the season at the Estoril Circuit. Mansell claimed two second places at the next round in Pau, which included his only pole of the year, before a run of four straight podium finishes which consisted a win. His third and last win came at Hungaroring in the final race. Four more podiums in the next two rounds came, before a double retirement in the penultimate Monza round. The first retirement was marred by a serious crash where he was launched skyward by Francesco Simonazzi, luckily the halo saved him and he emerged unscathed. He claimed a podium in the final round and ended third in the standings, having taken 15 podiums.

FIA Formula 3

2022 
Mansell made his first ever F3 appearance in the 2022 FIA Formula 3 Championship, at the Hungaroring with Charouz Racing System. In his debut, he replaced Zdeněk Chovanec. He had two decent weekends, achieving a best finish of 22nd at the Budapest Sprint Race and also outperforming teammate László Tóth. Mansell returned to his main campaign at the Euroformula Open before the Zandvoort round and was replaced by David Schumacher. Mansell was ranked 38th in the final standings.

2023 
At the end of September, Mansell partook in the post-season test with Campos Racing on the first two days. On November 28, Mansell was unveiled as a full-time driver with Campos Racing for the 2023 F3 season.

Personal life 
Although sharing the same last name, he is not related to Formula One World Champion Nigel Mansell.

Mansell has type 1 diabetes.

Karting record

Karting career summary

Racing record

Racing career summary 

† As Mansell was a guest driver, he was ineligible for points.
* Season still in progress

Complete Australian Formula 4 Championship results 
(key) (Races in bold indicate pole position) (Races in italics indicate fastest lap)

† As Mansell was a guest driver, he was ineligible for points.

Complete F4 British Championship results 
(key) (Races in bold indicate pole position) (Races in italics indicate fastest lap)

‡ Half points were awarded for Race 3, as less than 75% of the scheduled distance was completed.

Complete BRDC British Formula 3 Championship results 
(key) (Races in bold indicate pole position) (Races in italics indicate fastest lap)

Complete Euroformula Open Championship results 
(key) (Races in bold indicate pole position; races in italics indicate points for the fastest lap of top ten finishers)

Complete FIA Formula 3 Championship results 
(key) (Races in bold indicate pole position; races in italics indicate points for the fastest lap of top ten finishers)

References

External links 

  official website
 

2005 births
Living people
Australian racing drivers
Racing drivers from New South Wales
BRDC British Formula 3 Championship drivers
Carlin racing drivers
British F4 Championship drivers
Euroformula Open Championship drivers
Motopark Academy drivers
FIA Formula 3 Championship drivers
Charouz Racing System drivers
Karting World Championship drivers
Campos Racing drivers
Australian F4 Championship drivers
People with type 1 diabetes